Afrique is Africa in French.

It may also refer to:
 Afrique (impressionist) (1907-1961), South African singer and impressionist, born Alexander Witkin
 Afrique (album), a 1971 album by Count Basie
 Afrique, an American R&B-jazz studio band featuring guitarist David T. Walker
 Afrique & Histoire, French peer-reviewed academic journal about African history
 Afrique Airlines, an airline in Cotonou, Benin
 Air Afrique, a Pan-African airline
 Jean Afrique, a Danish adult film actress
 SS Afrique (1907) a passenger ship that sank in the bay of Biscay in 1920